The periodic table of mathematical shapes is popular name given to a project to classify Fano varieties. The project was thought up by Professor Alessio Corti, from the Department of Mathematics at Imperial College London. It aims to categorise all three-, four- and five-dimensional shapes into a single table, analogous to the periodic table of chemical elements. It is meant to hold the equations that describe each shape and, through this, mathematicians and other scientists expect to develop a better understanding of the shapes’ geometric properties and relations. 

The project has already won the Philip Leverhulme Prize—worth £70,000—from the Leverhulme Trust, and in 2019 a European Research Council grant.
While it is estimated that 500 million shapes can be defined algebraically in four dimensions, they may be decomposable (in the sense of the Minimal model program) into as few as a few thousand "building blocks".

See also 
List of complex and algebraic surfaces
List of surfaces
Lists of shapes
List of mathematical shapes
List of two-dimensional geometric shapes
Fano variety

References

External links
 Fano Varieties and Extremal Laurent Polynomials A collaborative research blog for the project.
 'Periodic Table of Shapes' to Give a New Dimension to Math
 Atoms ripple in the periodic table of shapes
 Nature's building blocks brought to life
 Databases of quantum periods for Fano manifolds by Tom Coates and Alexander M. Kasprzyk
Geometric shapes